The Calcutta Football League (CFL) is a ladder-based football competition in the Indian state of West Bengal, organised by Indian Football Association (WB), under state football leagues in India. Due to sponsorship reasons, the league is officially known as SNU Calcutta Football League, and is the oldest football league in Asia.

Indian Football Association (IFA) conducts the CFL with more than 160 mostly Kolkata based clubs and units. Started in 1898, this league is the oldest football league in Asia and regarded as one of the oldest football competitions in the world. CFL currently consists of a seven-tier pyramid system and there are more than 8,500 directly registered players of IFA participating in CFL every year, making it one of the biggest leagues in the country.

History

Early years (1890s–1910s)
In 1898, IFA introduced a two-tiered football league in Calcutta on the lines of English Football League in England and Wales. Until 1937, CFL was a major tournament with participation open to every team across the nation but after the establishment of AIFF, CFL became a regional competition.

The British Indian Army garrison stationed at Fort William played an instrumental role in shaping the Calcutta Football League by putting forth numerous teams alongside other European settlers. The Army teams won all but twelve of the titles until 1933. On eight of those twelve occasions the title was claimed by Calcutta and the rest by Dalhousie. Native teams were barred from participating for the first 15 seasons, and only clubs designated for civil servants, merchants, missionaries and other European nationalities made up the rest of the league, in a clearly designed exercise to exclude Indians of any religion.

In 1914, IFA permitted only two native clubs- Mohun Bagan and Aryan, in the Second Division of CFL. Mohun Bagan had a successful campaign and earned promotion to the Premier Division in their debut season, whereas Aryan was promoted to the top division two years later. From 1917 to 1920, the Second Division was won by two other native clubs, namely Kumortuli Club (in 1917, 1918 and 1919) and Town Club (in 1920), but their promotions were denied due to the allowance of only two native clubs to play in each tier.

Uprise of native dominance (1920s–1947) 
1921 saw the rise of East Bengal who began their CFL journey in the Second Division in place of Tajhat Club who had withdrawn from the league. Three years later East Bengal finished the Second Division as the joint-winners with Cameroons B and since Cameroons A was in the Premier Division, East Bengal got the opportunity for promotion. As two native clubs were already playing in the Premier Division, East Bengal's promotion was to be rejected as well. At this, the club called for amendments and in the following General Meeting of IFA, the nine British teams conveyed their approval, while Mohun Bagan and Aryan opposed it. Eventually the rule regulating the promotion of native clubs was abolished on the consent of the majority.

Even though the native clubs got more opportunities yet the British dominance continued till 1933. In 1934, Mohammedan won the title in their debut season and became the first native club to win CFL. The club went on to win the league six out of seven times from 1935 to 1941, with 1939 being the only exception when they didn't participate and Mohun Bagan went away with their first league title that year.

Post-independence era (1947–1970s) 
In the post-independence years, many other state leagues were introduced and various clubs from other states rose in glory, but CFL was still considered to be one of the top leagues in the nation and provided innumerable young talents. The league matches were mostly played in monsoon and matches involving the Big Three of Calcutta (Mohun Bagan, East Bengal and Mohammedan) regularly attracted more than 30,000 spectators. From 1934 to 1981, Eastern Railway was the only club outside of the Big Three to win the title in 1958.

The CFL had a long history of crowd trouble, and the burgeoning fanfare exacerbated it. The rapidly increasing off-the-field rivalry between the respective fans of Mohun Bagan and East Bengal saw one of the darkest days of Indian football when 16 fans lost their lives because of a stampede and rioting during a Kolkata Derby in CFL on 16 August 1980 in Eden Gardens. Since then the day is celebrated every year as the Football Lover's Day.

Years of obscurity (1980s–2000s)
In the 80s and 90s, the league caught many eyes with the rivalry between the two of Indian football's finest tacticians— P.K. Banerjee and Amal Dutta, besides the decades old rivalry among the Big Three.

Due to the rise in financial demands and steady modernisation of the sport, the league became dominated by the Big Three clubs as the smaller clubs struggled to keep up with their economy. The league saw the beginning of a major downfall with the introduction of NFL (now I-League). The importance of regional competitions decreased as all the top clubs in the state were racing for the national honours. From the later 20th century, Mohammedan eventually lost its stronghold and, Mohun Bagan and East Bengal became the only dominant teams in the league. In the new century, the IFA revamped the competition into a six-tier competition with the seventh tier, called the nursery league, reserved for sub-junior teams. The top tier, Premier Division, was also divided into two groups so as to include more teams.

Resurgence (2010s–present)
Starting in 2010, East Bengal won a record eight consecutive titles until their arch-rivals Mohun Bagan break the streak in 2018. In 2018 the league's popularity had a sudden upsurge and recorded more than 15,000 spectators even in matches involving small clubs. Most news reports in the local media reverberated the popular feeling— "The passion of the 70s is back." Small clubs like Peerless and George Telegraph introduced some of the foreign talents that later went on to become big names in the country.

In 2019, Peerless clinched the honour and became the second team outside the Big Three after Eastern Railway to win the league since 1934.
Since the independence of India, the CFL was never cancelled until 2020 when after a lengthy delay due to the COVID-19 pandemic it was decided to cancel the then CFL season.

Structure
With the season starting from 2015, the clubs/units were redistributed among the first six divisions and the last division was reserved only for youth teams.

Usually 12-14 teams participate in the Premier Division A and compete in a single-leg round'robin tournament. The top two teams are promoted to the I-League 2nd Division, and the bottom two teams are relegated to Premier Division B. In the Premier Division B, usually 10 teams are involved and the tournament is divided into two phases. In the first phase, all the teams play in a single-leg round-robin tournament. In the second phase, the teams are split into two groups (A and B) of top teams and bottom teams respectively. The teams in Group A compete for promotion to the Premier Division A, while those in Group B compete to avoid relegation to the First Division.

Apart from the Premier Division A, most other divisions are competed by about 20 teams, and the format of the tournaments in the lower divisions isn't always the same. The top teams in respective divisions are promoted to the division higher to it and the bottom teams get relegated to the lower one.

The most successful clubs participating in the top-tier of the league includes East Bengal, Mohun Bagan and Mohammedan. However, since 1982, the league has been won by either East Bengal or Mohun Bagan until 2019 when Peerless made history by winning their maiden league title and becoming the first team outside the Kolkata's Big Three to win the league after a gap of 61 years since Eastern Railway had won.

Sponsorship

Media coverage

Champions of the top-most division

By year

Pre-independence era (1898–1947)

Post-independence era (1947–present)

By team
The list only contains the names of the teams that have won the top-most division of the Calcutta Football League more than once.

See also
 Football in Kolkata

References

External links
 of the Indian Football Association (IFA)

 
 
1898 establishments in India
Recurring sporting events established in 1898
4
Football in West Bengal